Hamilton Augustus Haigh Smith (21 October 1884 – 28 October 1955) was an English cricketer. Smith was a right-handed batsman who bowled leg break googly.

Smith was educated at Marlborough College.

Smith made his first-class debut for Hampshire in the 1909 County Championship against Somerset. Moore represented Hampshire 27 times between 1909 and 1914, with Moore's final first-class appearance coming during the 1914 season against Yorkshire. In his 27 first-class matches, Moore scored 327 runs at an average of 10.54, with a high score of 43*. With the ball Smith took 14 wickets at a bowling average of 41.00, with best figures of 3/95.

Smith toured Ireland with Hampshire in 1909 and 1911, playing three non first-class matches against Woodbrook Club and Ground and Dublin University.

Outside of cricket, Smith had a keen interest in rugby union, serving as Honorary Secretary of Barbarians Rugby Football Club for more than 30 years and in the last few weeks of his life serving as club President. In his early days he was a keen rugby player, representing Blackheath F.C., Trojans and the Barbarians, while at county level he played for Hampshire.

Smith died at Paddington, London on 28 October 1955.

Notes

External links
Hamilton Smith at Cricinfo
Hamilton Smith at CricketArchive
Matches and detailed statistics for Hamilton Smith

1884 births
1955 deaths
People from Sandown
Sportspeople from the Isle of Wight
English cricketers
Hampshire cricketers
English rugby union administrators
Barbarian F.C. players
Blackheath F.C. players